Jeanlouis Cornuz (February 17, 1922 – October 14, 2007) was a Swiss writer.

Biography
Jeanlouis Cornuz was born in Lausanne, Switzerland. He studied literature at the University of Lausanne and at the University of Zürich. In 1946, at age 24, he worked as an interpreter during the Nuremberg international trials of Nazi German officials involved in the Holocaust. He then taught literature in Switzerland at state gymnasiums (Gymnase de la Cité in Lausanne and Gymnase de Chamblandes in Pully), and also worked as a teacher in the United States of America.
A columnist and journalist, he contributed to various newspapers and magazines in Switzerland. This sharp chess player was a benevolent editor-in-chief for the monthly l'Essor magazine from 1995 to 1998. He also was a delegate at the Canton de Vaud parliament for the left wing party POP (popular worker party).
Jeanlouis Cornuz published various essays about Jules Michelet, André Dhôtel, Gottfried Keller and an acclaimed biography of  Victor Hugo. He also contributed drama plays for the radio and stage and authored several novels. A Germanist, he translated Ernst Wiechert, Walter Diggelmann, Urs Schwarz, Wolfgang Leonhard and Gottfried Keller from German into French.

Novels 
La vieille femme, Ed. du Viaduc, 1954 (Roman) 
Le réfractaire, Rencontre, 1964 (Roman) 
Parce que c'était toi, La Baconnière, 1966. (Roman) 
Les USA à l'heure du LSD, La Baconnière, 1968. 
Reconnaissance d'Edmond Gilliard, L'Age d'homme, 1975
Jean-Claude Stehli, Centre d'art Les Fontaines, 1978
La Grande année 1968; ill. Thierry Rollier, Ed. de la Thièle, 1979
Le Professeur, Favre, 1981. (Roman)
Portraits sans réserve, Plaisir de lire, 1983
Olsommer; en collab. avec Fabienne Luisier, Centre d'art Les Fontaines, 1998
Les désastres de la guerre, L'Age d'homme, 1994. (Roman)
Les caprices : Les désastres de la guerre II, L'Age d'homme, 2000
Le complexe de Laïos : Les désastres de la guerre III, L'Age d'homme, 2003

Awards 
1981 Vaud canton writers award

Bibliography
Roger Francillon, Histoire de la littérature en Suisse romande, vol 3, p. 328. 
Alain Nicollier, Henri-Charles Dahlem, Dictionnaire des écrivains suisses d'expression française, vol 1, pp. 282.

External links 
Jeanlouis Cornuz sur Culturactif
Jeanlouis Cornuz à la BCUL

1922 births
2007 deaths
Swiss writers
People from Lausanne